Chingjaroi is a village located in northern Ukhrul district, Manipur state, India. It is approximately 84 kilometers from Ukhrul district headquarters.

Total population 
As per 2015 census,  Chingjaroi Khullen village has population of 1825 of which 927 are males while 898 are females as per Population Census 2011.

In Chingjaroi Khullen village population of children with age 0-6 is 272 which makes up 14.90 % of total population of village. Average Sex Ratio of Chingjaroi Khullen village is 969 which is lower than Manipur state average of 985. Child Sex Ratio for the Chingjaroi Khullen as per census is 1142, higher than Manipur average of 930.According to 2015 census report, The total population of Chingjaroi Christian Village (CV) is 1280 of 214 households, of which 618 are male and 662 are female. Children in age group 0–6 was 158. The average sex ratio of Chingjaroi CV is 1071 females per 1000 males which is slightly higher than the state average of 985. Literacy rate of the village is 83.42%.

2011 census report records the total population of Chingjaroi Khunou as 548 with 98 households, of which 272 are male and 276 are female. The literacy rate of Chingjaroi Khunou is 68.93%.

Chingjaroi as a whole is flanked by Phaibung in the west, Jessami in the north, Peh in the south and Tusom in the east.

References

Villages in Ukhrul district